The , officially the Tenpō sexagenary unitary calendar (天保壬寅元暦 Tenpō jin'in genreki), was a Japanese lunisolar calendar. It was published in the Tenpō era (1830–1844) and was in use during the late Edo period, from 1844 to 1872.

History
This was the last traditional calendar system created by Japanese astronomers and mathematicians.

Overview
The calendar is a lunisolar calendar which adopted Teiki-hō, where solar terms are equally divided by solar longitude, in place of Heiki-hō, in which they are equally divided by time. The lunar month starts on a day with a new moon. A leap month is added when there are three lunar months between a lunar month which includes a solstice/equinox and the following lunar month which includes a solstice/equinox. In that case the leap month is the lunar month which does not include any chūki 中気 (one of the twelve solar terms that are used to determine the months of the year). The months which include a solstice/equinox are fixed as the second, fifth, eighth and eleventh months respectively. The time of the day used in the calendar to determine the dates of solar terms and lunar phases is that observed at Kyoto.

In previous calendars, hours were of uniform lengths. In the Tenpō calendar, the length of hours changed depending on the time of year. This made it extremely challenging to make Japanese mechanical clocks.

The Tenpō calendar is no longer officially maintained.

Known problems
The calendar's assignment of fixed month numbers on lunar months containing solstices/equinoxes assume that either two or three full lunar months will always occur between such months, and when there are three, that there will be one month without a chūki to be designated as the leap month. It does not clearly define how to treat the case where there is only one full interceding lunar month, nor when such a period contains more than one month not containing any chūki. In 2033, for the first time in the calendar's history, there will be only one complete lunar month between the autumnal equinox and winter solstice, and two chūki-less months between the winter solstice and 2034 spring equinox.

See also
 Japanese calendar
 Sexagenary cycle
 Tenpō

References

External links
 National Diet Library, "The Japanese Calendar"

Specific calendars
History of science and technology in Japan
Time in Japan